Bélesta is the name or part of the name of the following communes in France:

 Bélesta, Ariège, in the Ariège department
 Bélesta, Pyrénées-Orientales, in the Pyrénées-Orientales department
 Bélesta-en-Lauragais, in the Haute-Garonne department